The Archeparchy of Haifa and the Holy Land (in Latin: Archieparchia Ptolemaidensis Maronitarum in the Holy Land) is a branch of the Maronite Church immediately subject to the Patriarch of Antioch of the Maronites. Since 2012, it has been governed by Archbishop Moussa El-Hage, OAM.

Territory and statistics
The archeparchy includes all the faithful of the Maronite Church who live in Israel. The archeparchial seat is the city of Haifa, where the Saint Louis the King Cathedral is located.

In the archeparchy in 2019, there were approximately 10,000 members, 14 priests, 8 parishes and 3 missions.

History
There was an ancient Catholic diocese in Akka in the third century. The Maronite Archeparchy was erected on 8 June 1996, with territory taken from Maronite Catholic Archeparchy of Tyre. On 5 October of the same year, the archeparchy has ceded part of its territory for the benefit of the erection of the patriarchal exarchates of Jerusalem and Palestine and Jordan, which have since joined in persona episcopi to all archeparchy.

Affiliated bishops
 Paul Nabil El-Sayah (8 June 1996 – 6 June 2011, appointed Archbishop of the Patriarchal Curia of Antioch)
 Moussa El-Hage, OAM, (since 16 June 2012)

See also
 Catholic Church in Israel
 List of Catholic dioceses (alphabetical)
 Christianity in Israel
 Maronites in Israel

Notes

References

External links
 http://www.catholic-hierarchy.org/diocese/dhaif.html
 Storia dei Maroniti in Terra Santa: in French and in English
 Vatican.va
 Vatican.va

1996 establishments in Israel
Christian organizations established in 1996
Maronite Catholic eparchies
Organizations based in Haifa
Religion in Haifa